Light is an unincorporated community in Maries County, in the U.S. state of Missouri.

History
A post office called Light was established in 1894, and remained in operation until 1923. Klabe Light, an early postmaster, gave the community his last name.

References

Unincorporated communities in Maries County, Missouri
Unincorporated communities in Missouri